The Lycée Français René-Verneau de Gran Canaria is a French international school in Telde, Gran Canaria, Spain. It was established in 1974 and has integrated the Mission laïque française (Mlf) in 1986. It serves levels maternelle (preschool) through terminale, the final year of lycée (senior high school) and it allows French, English and Spanish languages learning from preschool for all children. As of 2017 the school has about 400 students range from 3 to 18 years.

See also
 Agency for French Education Abroad
 Education in France
 List of international schools
 Mission laïque française
 Multilingualism
 René Verneau

References

External links
 
 

French international schools in Africa
French international schools in Spain
International schools in the Canary Islands
Trilingual schools
Cambridge schools in Spain
Educational institutions established in 1974
1974 establishments in Spain
AEFE contracted schools
Mission laïque française